Room at the Bottom is a British comedy television series which originally aired on ITV between 1986 and 1988.

Main cast
 James Bolam as Nesbitt Gunn
 Keith Barron as Kevin Hughes
 Deborah Grant as Celia Pagett-Smythe
 Richard Wilson as Chaplain Toby Duckworth
 Erika Hoffman as Nancy
 Oliver Cotton as Tom

References

Bibliography
 Newcomb, Horace . Encyclopedia of Television. Routledge, 2014.

External links
 

1986 British television series debuts
1988 British television series endings
1980s British comedy television series
ITV sitcoms
English-language television shows
Television series by Yorkshire Television